Aymar-Joseph de Roquefeuil du Bousquet (19 March 1714, in Brest, France – 1 July 1782, in Bourbonne-les-Bains), comte de Roquefeuil, was a French officer in the French Navy during the reigns of Louis XV and Louis XVI.

Life 
The eldest son of the naval lieutenant general Jacques Aymar de Roquefeuil du Bousquet and his wife Jeanne-Louise du Main, Aymar Joseph de Roquefeuil was a member of the de Roquefeuil-Blanquefort family, a noble French family from Rouergue. He became a garde-marine at Brest aged 13 in 1727. Rising to ensign (1731), he navigated the Baltic Sea to Saint Domingue and was made lieutenant de vaisseau in 1741 then Capitaine de Vaisseau and knight of the ordre de Saint Louis on 1 January 1746, at only 32 years old, for noteworthy service over the last 19 years. He commanded the "Aquilon" for 15 months in the Antilles in 1750 and 1751. Having the frigate of Duchaffault under his orders and accompanied by a British frigate, he skilfully fulfilled a delicate mission for which he was praised many times by the Rouillé ministry. This allowed him to actively collaborate with vicomte Sébastien-François Bigot de Morogues, commander of Brest, in the foundation of Brest's académie de Marine in 1752, of which he and his younger brother were two of the first members, but which was decimated by the town's losses between 1756 and 1763.

Between 1754 and 1758, Roquefeuil acted as second in command of a squadron in the Antilles, under La Galissonnière, Périer then Bompart. Promoted to chef d'escadre des Armées navales on 1 January 1761, at only 47 years old, and received the command of the ships and port at Brest, to which the king added command of Brest's town and castle and the Isle of Ushant on 25 March 1762 (three positions his father had already held). In a brief presentation the navy minister wrote to the king about Roquefeuil, who approved in his own hand "He has served for nearly 40 years in the Navy, on 16 campaigns, has held 4 commands at sea and has for 5 years commanded the Port of Brest to the satisfaction of His Majesty".  Aged 52, he was on 3 August 1766 made lieutenant general, retaining his Brest commands, where he and the minister Duc de Praslin were allowed to promote the new "Académie royale de marine", under royal patronage, in April 1769 – Roquefeuil became its first director.  He was promoted to vice-amiral on 6 April 1781 as well as Grand Croix of the Ordre royal et militaire de Saint-Louis.

Assessment
He was a stubborn moderniser, a peerless organizer and a highly experimented sailor who left a deep imprint on the navy, the Brest fleet and the port and town of Brest during his 20 years in command of them (1761–81) then the two years he served as vice-amiral from 1781 until his death. Under his command, budgets were obtained from the king and his ministers and several powerful well-equipped ships were planned, launched and fitted out. These made up the remarkable "Fleet of Louis XVI", probably the most coherent one France had ever possessed. Little known by the public, he is considered by naval historians as one of the main men behind the organization and realization of Louis XV and Louis XVI's naval policy which allowed French and American allies to beat Great Britain in the American Revolutionary War.

References

1714 births
1782 deaths
French Navy officers
Grand Crosses of the Order of Saint Louis